John McMartin (3 March 1944 – 13 February 2018) was an Australian rugby league player who played in the 1960s and 1970s.

Playing career
McMartin was graded with the Parramatta club in the mid 1960s and was playing first grade by 1967. In his final year with the Eels in 1975, he represented New South Wales in one match. 

In 1976, he was offered a $10000 contract to join the Cronulla-Sutherland Sharks and four seasons with them including the 1978 Grand Final. 

McMartin was the identical twin brother of Mal McMartin, who also played in the NSWRFL for the Penrith Panthers, the Balmain Tigers and the Parramatta Eels.  

McMartin retired at the end of the 1979 NSWRFL season.

Death
McMartin died on 13 February 2018.

References

1944 births
2018 deaths
Parramatta Eels players
Cronulla-Sutherland Sharks players
New South Wales rugby league team players
Australian rugby league players
Rugby league hookers